Noé Jitrik (23 January 1928 – 6 October 2022) was an Argentine literary critic.

Jitrik was born in Argentina on 23 January 1928. He was director of the Instituto de literatura hispanoamericana at the University of Buenos Aires, and was a notable participant in the cultural journal Contorno in the 1950s in Argentina.

While originally enamored of the work of Jorge Luis Borges he became convinced that Borges had nothing new to write after the publication of El hacedor in 1960 and his unfavorable criticism of Borges slowly became what he could only term "complex" in an article in 1981 in Les Temps Modernes.

Partial bibliography
Critical texts
Leopoldo Lugones. Mito Nacional. Palestra, 1960.
Horacio Quiroga. Una obra de experiencia y riesgo. Ediciones Culturales Argentinas, 1960. Nueva versión corregida, Montevideo, Arca, 1967. 
Procedimiento y mensaje en la novela. Universidad Nacional de Córdoba, 1962. <
Escritores argentinos, dependencia o libertad. Ediciones del Candil, 1967.
Esteban Echeverría, Buenos Aires, CEAL, 1967. 
Horacio Quiroga. CEAL, 1967. > 
Muerte y resurrección de "Facundo". CEAL, 1968.
El 80 y su mundo. Buenos Aires, Jorge Álvarez, 1968.
El mundo del ochenta. CEAL, 1982. (Segunda edición de El 80 y su mundo.)
Tres ensayos sobre Esteban Echeverría, Besançon, Faculté des Lettres. Col. Les annales. 1969.
José Hernández. CEAL, 1971.
Sarmiento. CEAL, 1971.
José Martí. CEAL 1971.
Ensayos y estudios de literatura argentina. Buenos Aires, Galerna. 1971.
El fuego de la especie. Buenos Aires, Siglo XXI, 1971.
La novela futura de Macedonio Fernández Caracas, Biblioteca de la Universidad Central, 1973. 
Producción literaria y producción social. Buenos Aires, Sudamericana, 1975.
El No-Existente Caballero (Ensayo sobre la forma del "personaje" en la literatura latinoamericana), Buenos Aires, Megápolis, 1975.
Las contradicciones del modernismo. México, El Colegio de México, 1978.
La memoria compartida. México, Editorial Veracruzana, 1982. CEAL, 1987 (2a edición).
La lectura como actividad. México, Premiá, 1982.
Los dos ejes de la cruz. Puebla, UAP, 1983. 
Las armas y las razones. Sudamericana, 1984.  
La vibración del presente. México, FCE, 1987. 
Cuando leer es hacer. Santa Fe, Universidad Nacional del Litoral, 1987.
Temas de teoría. El trabajo crítico y la crítica literaria. Premiá, 1987.
Lectura y cultura. México, Dirección de Fomento Editorial, UNAM, 1987.
El balcón barroco. México, UNAM, 1988. 
Historia de una mirada. UNAM y El Equilibrista, 1992. Reescritura de Los dos ejes de la Cruz. También en Buenos Aires, Ediciones de la Flor, 1992. 
El dominio de la palabra (edición de los materiales producidos en el Primer Encuentro de Problemas del Discurso, marzo de 1987, UNAM, FCPyS, mayo de 1992).
La selva luminosa, Ensayos críticos (1987-1991). Buenos Aires, Facultad de Filosofía y Letras, 1993.
Historia e imaginación literaria. Buenos Aires, Biblos, 1995.
Suspender toda certeza, antología crítica (1959-1976), Biblos, 1997.
El ejemplo de la familia, Ensayos y trabajos sobre literatura argentina. Buenos Aires, Eudeba, 1998.

Fiction
Addio a la mamma, Fiesta en casa, y otros poemas (1965). Ediciones Zona de la Poesía Americana
Llamar antes de entrar (1972) relatos. S’ntesis Dosmil, Caracas
Comer y comer (1974). Ediciones de la Flor 
Del otro lado de la puerta: rapsodia (1974) (con dibujos de Roberto Broullon). Ediciones Megópolis 
Limbo (1989) 
Citas de un día (1992). Alfaguara 
Mares del sur (1997). Buenos Aires, Tusquets.

References

External links
Instituto de literatura hispanoamericana webpage
Brief biography (in Spanish)

1928 births
2022 deaths
20th-century Argentine male writers
20th-century non-fiction writers
Argentine literary critics
Latin Americanists
Academic staff of the University of Buenos Aires